is a Japanese professional footballer who plays for Süper Lig club Antalyaspor and the Japan national team. Primarily a left winger, he has also played on the right flank and as a central second striker.

After starting his career with Tokyo Verdy of the J2 League and FC Tokyo of the J1 League, he spent several years in Portugal's Primeira Liga with Portimonense and Porto. He also had brief spells in Qatar, the United Arab Emirates and Turkey.

He was part of the Japanese under-23 team at the 2016 Olympics. First capped at senior level in 2018, he was part of the Japan team at the 2019 Copa América.

Club career

Portimonense
On 27 August 2017, Nakajima moved abroad for the first time, signing a season-long loan with Portimonense of Portugal's Primeira Liga. After scoring 10 goals and as many assists in 32 total matches for the team from the Algarve, he signed a permanent deal in May 2018.

Al Duhail
In February 2019, Nakajima joined Qatar Stars League side Al Duhail for a reported transfer fee of €35 million. He played seven games for the eventual runners-up, and scored once in a 6–0 home win over Al Ahli on 28 February.

Porto
On 5 July 2019, Porto announced an agreement with Al-Duhail for the acquisition of Nakajima's sports rights, in a €12 million transfer fee (50% of the player economic rights). He signed a five-year contract, keeping him contractually linked until 30 June 2024, with an €80 million release clause.

Nakajima made his Porto debut on 13 August 2019 in the second leg of the UEFA Champions League third qualifying round away to Krasnodar, playing the full 90 minutes of a 3–2 loss that eliminated the team on the away goals rule. He scored his first goal on 19 December 2019, the only one of a home win over Santa Clara in the fifth round of the Taça de Portugal, his 17th appearance.
On 16 January 2021, Nakajima joined Al Ain of the UAE Pro League on a six-month loan deal including an optional €40 million transfer clause. After his time in the Middle East was ended by a tibia break, on 25 August that year he returned on loan to Portimonense for a season.

Antalyaspor
Nakajima signed for Turkish club Antalyaspor in 2022. He made his debut on 18 September 2022 against Adana Demirspor, coming on the 59th minute only to be sent off in just 20 seconds after receiving a red card for a late sliding tackle.

International career

Youth level and under-23 career
Nakajima was first selected to represent the Japanese under-17 national team when he was called up to the Slovakia Cup, a friendly tournament in early May 2011 that served the purpose of preparing the squad for the FIFA U-17 World Cup. A month later, he was in Mexico playing at the 2011 U-17 World Cup, where he appeared in two matches and scored one goal in a 3–2 loss against Brazil in the quarter-finals. In August 2013, Nakajima was called for the Japanese under-20 national team to participate in the L'Alcúdia International Football Tournament in Spain. The squad was eliminated in the group stage, and he scored in a 2–1 win against Argentina.

In January 2014, Nakajima played for the Japanese under-23 national team in the 2013 AFC U-22 Championship. He appeared in all three matches of the group stage, scoring once against Iran and twice against Australia, as the team reached the quarter-finals. In September 2014, Nakajima was called for the 2014 Asian Games, scoring against Iraq and Nepal in the group stage. The team reached the quarter-finals.

In March 2015, he played two matches in the AFC U-23 Championship qualification and scored a double against Vietnam. The team reached the first place of the group and was granted the qualification for the 2016 AFC U-23 Championship. In January 2016, he participated in the championship, scoring a double in the extra-time of the quarter-finals match against Iraq and eventually won the competition 
with a 3–2 triumph against South Korea. Nakajima was also crown the Most Valuable Player of the Tournament.

In August 2016, he was selected for the Japanese Olympic national team (under-23) that competed in the 2016 Summer Olympics in Rio de Janeiro. He played three matches and scored a goal against Colombia, while the team came third in the group stage.

Senior career
On 15 March 2018, Nakajima was called by national manager Vahid Halilhodžić for upcoming matches against Mali and Ukraine. Eight days later, he debuted and scored his first goal for Japanese national team against Mali in a 1–1 draw.

Hajime Moriyasu named Nakajima in the squad for the 2019 Copa América in Brazil, which Japan guest entered with a mainly under-23 team. He scored the opening goal against Ecuador in the last group game in Belo Horizonte, but the 1–1 draw eliminated the team.

Career statistics

Club

International

Scores and results list Japan's goal tally first, score column indicates score after each Nakajima goal.

Honours

Al-Duhail 
Qatar Emir Cup: 2019

Porto
Primeira Liga: 2019–20
Taça de Portugal: 2019–20

Japan U23
AFC U-23 Championship: 2016

Individual
AFC U-23 Championship Most Valuable Player: 2016
Primeira Liga Forward of the Month: October/November 2017
Primeira Liga Player of the Month: September 2018
SPJF Goal of the Month: November 2017 vs Tondela
SPJF Goal of the Month: February 2018 vs Feirense

References

External links

1994 births
Living people
Association football people from Tokyo
Japanese footballers
Japan youth international footballers
J1 League players
J2 League players
J3 League players
Primeira Liga players
Qatar Stars League players
UAE Pro League players
Süper Lig players
Tokyo Verdy players
Kataller Toyama players
FC Tokyo players
FC Tokyo U-23 players
Portimonense S.C. players
Al-Duhail SC players
FC Porto players
Al Ain FC players
Antalyaspor footballers
Japanese expatriate footballers
Expatriate footballers in Portugal
Expatriate footballers in Qatar
Expatriate footballers in the United Arab Emirates
Expatriate footballers in Turkey
Japanese expatriate sportspeople in Portugal
Japanese expatriate sportspeople in Qatar
Japanese expatriate sportspeople in the United Arab Emirates
Japanese expatriate sportspeople in Turkey
J.League U-22 Selection players
Footballers at the 2014 Asian Games
Footballers at the 2016 Summer Olympics
Olympic footballers of Japan
Association football wingers
Asian Games competitors for Japan
2019 Copa América players
Japan international footballers